Magnetogastrography is the science of recording magnetogastrograms (MGGs). Magnetogastrograms are recordings of magnetic fields resulting from electrical currents in the stomach. The magnetic fields are typically recorded using SQUIDs.

See also 
 Electrogastrogram
 Magnetoencephalography

External links
 Gastrointestinal SQUID Technology Laboratory at Vanderbilt University

Medical imaging